Torsten Oswald Magnus Holmberg (17 July 1882 – 11 February 1969) was a Swedish gymnast and tug of war competitor who participated in the 1908 Summer Olympics and in the 1912 Summer Olympics.

He was part of the Swedish team, which was able to win the gold medal in the gymnastics men's team event in 1908. In the 1912 Summer Olympics he won his second gold medal as member of the Swedish gymnastics team in the Swedish system event.

At the 1906 Intercalated Games in Athens, he was a member of the Swedish tug of war team, which won the bronze medal.

References

External links
 
 

1882 births
1969 deaths
Swedish male artistic gymnasts
Olympic gymnasts of Sweden
Olympic tug of war competitors of Sweden
Olympic gold medalists for Sweden
Olympic medalists in gymnastics
Medalists at the 1906 Intercalated Games
Medalists at the 1908 Summer Olympics
Medalists at the 1912 Summer Olympics
Tug of war competitors at the 1906 Intercalated Games
Gymnasts at the 1908 Summer Olympics
Gymnasts at the 1912 Summer Olympics
Swedish Army officers